Ben Hebard Fuller (February 27, 1870 – June 8, 1937) was a major general in the United States Marine Corps and served as the 15th Commandant of the Marine Corps between 1930 and 1934.

Biography
Born in Big Rapids, Michigan, Fuller was a member of the United States Naval Academy class of 1889.  After serving two years of service as a naval cadet, a requirement at the time before commissioning, he was appointed a second lieutenant in the Marine Corps on July 1, 1891. He, with six other members of his class, attended the first course for new Marine officers at the School of Application, which was the prototype for today's Basic School.

On 26 October 1892, he married Katherine Heaton Offley. Together, they had two children.

Captain Fuller participated in the Battle of Novaleta, Philippine Islands on October 8, 1899, and was commended for gallant, meritorious, and courageous conduct in the Battle of Tientsin, China on July 13, 1900.

From 1904 to 1906, he served at the Naval Station, Honolulu, Territory of Hawaii. In June and July 1908, he was on detached duty with an expeditionary force organized for service in Panama, and from August of that year until January 1910, commanded a Marine Battalion at Camp Elliott, Panama Canal Zone. From March to June 1911, he commanded the 3rd Regiment of Marines at Camp Meyer, Guantanamo Bay, Cuba.

From 1911 to 1915, he commanded various posts and stations in the United States, and during this period also, he completed the Field Officers’ Course at the Army Service Schools, Fort Leavenworth, Kansas, and the course at the Army War College, Washington, D.C. Following a tour of duty as Fleet Marine Officer of the U.S. Atlantic Fleet, from January 1915 to June 1916, LtCol Fuller was assigned to the Naval War College, Newport, Rhode Island, where he successfully completed the course.

In August 1918, he was assigned to command the 2nd Brigade of Marines in the Dominican Republic, remaining there until October 1920. He also served on the Staff of the Military Governor of Santo Domingo as Secretary of State, Interior, Police, War and Navy, from December 1919, until his detachment departed from Santo Domingo.

From November 1920 to July 1922, he served on the staff of the Naval War College, Newport, and from July 1922 to January 1923, commanded the Marine Corps Schools, Quantico, Virginia. In January 1924, he assumed command of the 1st Brigade of Marines in the Republic of Haiti, with headquarters at Port-au-Prince, and served in this capacity until December 8, 1925.

Following his return to the United States from Haiti, Brigadier General Fuller was assigned to Headquarters Marine Corps as President of the Marine Examining and Retiring Board, serving in that capacity until July 1928, when he was appointed Assistant to the Commandant of the Marine Corps. Following the death of the Commandant, Major General Wendell C. Neville on July 9, 1930, Brigadier General Fuller was promoted to major general and appointed Commandant of the Marine Corps. He served in that capacity until March 1, 1934, when he was retired from active service, having attained the statutory retirement age of sixty-four years.

Major General Fuller's tenure was a period of general retrenchment and withdrawal of Marines from foreign countries. Beginning in 1933, these Marines composed the newly designated Fleet Marine Force, the principal operating force of the Marine Corps.

Major General Fuller died on June 8, 1937, aged 67, at the U.S. Naval Hospital, Washington, D.C., and was buried on June 11, 1937, in the U.S. Naval Academy Cemetery at Annapolis, Maryland, beside the grave of his son, Captain Edward C. Fuller of the 6th Marine Regiment, who was killed in action in the Battle of Belleau Wood during World War I.

Promotion history
 Second Lieutenant, July 1, 1891
 First Lieutenant, March 16, 1893
 Captain, March 3, 1899
 Major, December 27, 1903
 Lieutenant colonel, February 3, 1911
 Colonel, August 29, 1916
 Brigadier General (temporary), July 1, 1918
 Brigadier General, February 8, 1924
 Major General August 7, 1930
 Commandant of the Marine Corps, August 7, 1930

Medals and decoration
Fuller held the following medals and decorations:

Namesake
The United States Navy transport ship  was named in his honor.

The road running from the main gate of Marine Corps Base Quantico to the town of Quantico, Virginia is named Fuller Road.

An enlisted housing facility at the Naval Support Activity Annapolis is named Fuller Hall.

See also

References

 

1870 births
1937 deaths
People from Big Rapids, Michigan
American military personnel of the Banana Wars
American military personnel of the Boxer Rebellion
American military personnel of the Philippine–American War
United States Marine Corps Commandants
United States Marine Corps generals
United States Naval Academy alumni
Naval War College alumni
Burials at the United States Naval Academy Cemetery
Military personnel from Michigan
United States Marine Corps personnel of World War I
People from Hamilton, Virginia